Depressaria constancei is a moth in the family Depressariidae. It was described by Clarke in 1947. It is found in North America, where it has been recorded from Oregon and California.

The larvae feed on Lomatium californicum.

References

Moths described in 1947
Depressaria
Moths of North America